Lake Ecma or Lake Igma (possibly from Quechua ikma widow, qucha lake) is a lake in the Wansu mountain range in Peru. It lies in the Arequipa Region, La Unión Province, Puyca District.

References 

Lakes of Peru
Lakes of Arequipa Region